The Libre Map Project is an online collection of all digital USGS 1:24K scale topographic maps (as well as various other GIS data) covering the United States, available as a free download.

The Libre Map Project was started by Jared Benedict and around 100 additional individuals contributing money to purchase (or "liberate") a full set of 1:24K scale USGS topographic maps in Digital raster graphic form. The map files were then hosted by archive.org to ensure the map data will continue to be freely available to everyone indefinitely. 56,000 maps in Digital raster graphic form were acquired on DVDs for $1600 to make the data available. Additional data made available through the project includes SVG boundary files for every US state, Topologically Integrated Geographic Encoding and Referencing (Tiger)/Line 2003 vector map data, and the USGS GeoNames database.

See also
TopoQuest - Topographic map viewer using the maps

References

External links
 Libre Map Project
 Internet Archive USGS Map Page

Topography techniques
Web Map Services
Internet Archive collections